The Hilton Mexico City Reforma is a 24-story, 457-room hotel on Avenida Juárez, close to the Alameda Central, in Mexico City, Mexico.

Description 
The hotel opened on February 27, 2003 as the Sheraton Centro Historico Hotel & Convention Center. It was designed by Pascal Arquitectos, developed by Inmobiliaria Interpres and constructed from 2001–03, with Proarquitectura as the main contractor  and Aguilar Ingenieros as the structural engineer. 

It has a helipad on the roof, and a  convention centre with a capacity of 5,000 people. 

The hotel was built on the site of the historic Hotel del Prado, constructed in 1948 and demolished in 1985, due to structural damage from the earthquake.

The Sheraton Centro Historico received a special jury recognition by the Bienal de Interiorismo de Bellas Artes in September 2003, an IMEI award (smart building) in December 2003, and was an award winner in the Tourism category of the Peremio Nacional de Interiorismo in July 2006.

The hotel joined Hilton Hotels on December 2, 2009 and was renamed Hilton Mexico City Reforma.

It was the venue for Wikimania 2015. The hotel interior was renovated in 2018.

References

External links
Hilton Mexico City Reforma official website

2003 establishments in Mexico
Hilton Hotels & Resorts hotels
Hotels established in 2003
Hotel buildings completed in 2003
Hotels in Mexico City
Hotels in Mexico